Apocryptodon is a genus of gobies native to the Indian Ocean and the western Pacific Ocean.

Species
There are currently two recognized species in this genus:
 Apocryptodon madurensis (Bleeker, 1849) (Madura goby)
 Apocryptodon punctatus Tomiyama, 1934
 Apocryptodon wirzi Koumans, 1937 (Wirz's goby)

References

Oxudercinae